Davor Bratić (born 1 May 1987) is a Croatian footballer who plays for NK Vuteks-Sloga. His preferred position is central midfield, where he has played throughout his career.

Club career
Besides four spells with different clubs in Albania, Bratić played for 5 teams in the Austrian lower leagues.

Honours

KF Skënderbeu Korçë
 Albanian Superliga (2): 2010-11 2011-12

References

External links
Profile at Football Database

1987 births
Living people
Sportspeople from Vukovar
Croatian footballers
Association football midfielders
HNK Vukovar '91 players
NK Solin players
NK Vinogradar players
KF Skënderbeu Korçë players
Flamurtari Vlorë players
FK Kukësi players
KS Kastrioti players
NK Bistra players
SC Weiz players
Kapfenberger SV players
Kategoria Superiore players
First Football League (Croatia) players
2. Liga (Austria) players
Austrian Landesliga players
Austrian Regionalliga players
Croatian expatriate footballers
Croatian expatriate sportspeople in Albania
Expatriate footballers in Albania
Croatian expatriate sportspeople in Austria
Expatriate footballers in Austria